Leïla is a 2001 Danish film directed by Gabriel Axel.

Plot
A young Danish guy, Nils, is visiting Morocco, where he meets the 16-year-old Berber girl Leïla. It marks the beginning of a great, all-encompassing passion. Leïla must defy her family to be with Nils, and their love has big consequences.

Cast
 Mélanie Doutey as Leïla
 Arnaud Binard as Nils
 Malika El-Omari as Moona
 Azeddine Bouayad as Brahim
 Michel Bouquet - narrator
 Mitch Bateman as party goer
 Christian E. Christiansen as Nils' friend no. 2
  as Nils' friend no. 1 (uncredited)

Reception
The film was met with very negative reviews and was a box office bomb. Swedish film critic  in Variety wrote "Pic feels tepid and devoid of emotional involvement. Due to the use of v.o., the two leads never get a real chance to convey their characters' emotions."

References

External links
 
 

2001 films
Danish drama films
2000s French-language films
Films set in Morocco
Films directed by Gabriel Axel